Rupert Victor John Carington, 5th Baron Carrington JP, DL (20 December 1891 – 19 November 1938), was a British peer.

Life
He succeeded to the title in 1929. Carrington was the son of Rupert Carington, 4th Baron Carrington, and Edith, daughter of John Horsefall and Mary Maiden. He fought in the First World War as a captain in the Grenadier Guards and was twice wounded. After the war he served as a Deputy Lieutenant and Justice of the Peace for Devon. He succeeded his father in the barony in 1929, but never spoke in the House of Lords.

Family
Lord Carrington married the Hon. Sybil Marion Colville, daughter of his half-cousin Charles Colville, 2nd Viscount Colville of Culross, in 1916. They had one son and one daughter. He died in November 1938, aged 46, and was succeeded by his only son, Peter, who became a prominent Conservative politician. Lady Carrington died in December 1946.

References

1891 births
1938 deaths
Deputy Lieutenants of Devon
Grenadier Guards officers
British Army personnel of World War I
5th Dragoon Guards officers
Rupert
Rupert 5